Schwarzenbach am Wald is a town in the district of Hof, in Bavaria, Germany. It is situated 21 km west of Hof, and 23 km northeast of Kulmbach.

Geography

Geographical Situation 
Schwarzenbach am Wald is situated in a natural environment at the bottom of the Döbraberg in the natural park Frankenwald

City Structure

References

Hof (district)